Adelshofen is a municipality in the district of Fürstenfeldbruck in Bavaria in Germany.

References

Fürstenfeldbruck (district)